Unificación Puertorriqueña Tripartita (Tripartite Puerto Rican Unification) was political party in Puerto Rico founded on 14 July 1940. It resulted from the merger of three political parties: Partido Liberal Puertorriqueño, Partido Unión Republicana Progresista and Partido Laborista Puro. It supported statehood for Puerto Rico as its major tenet.

References

Sources
Coaliciones, alianzas, y uniones entre las colectividades (1896-1945) by CECANGPR
Entre 1920 y 1924 on Pomarrosas

Defunct political parties in Puerto Rico
Political parties established in 1940